Tamara is a 2005 supernatural horror film directed by Jeremy Haft and starring Jenna Dewan, Katie Stuart, Chad Faust, Claudette Mink, Melissa Elias, and Matthew Marsden. It was released in select theatres in the United States by City Lights Pictures, a Manhattan-based production company.

Plot
Tamara Riley is a shy but intelligent teenage girl who likes witchcraft and has a crush on Bill Natolly, her handsome English teacher. When a critical article she writes about the school's athletes is published, two of the star athletes, Shawn and Patrick, seek revenge. Tamara attempts to perform a magical ritual to bind her fate to that of Mr. Natolly, but when she must spill her own blood, she ceases the ritual.

That night, a prank is orchestrated by Shawn and Patrick, along with Shawn's girlfriend Kisha. Shawn calls Tamara, impersonating Mr. Natolly, and invites her to a motel room, where a video camera is placed. Shawn, Patrick, and Kisha watch as Tamara undresses, along with three others—Chloe, Jesse, and Roger—who did not know about the prank. Shawn barges in and taunts Tamara, and she is accidentally killed in a struggle. Despite Chloe's demands that they inform the police, she is blackmailed into helping bury Tamara.

However, they are shocked when Tamara walks into class, looking more beautiful than ever before. They convince themselves that she was only unconscious and dug her way out of the ground. While Roger is watching a film in the school audiovisual room, the image on the screen suddenly changes to the video of Tamara's murder. Roger removes the tape and is confronted by Tamara, who torments him with hallucinations of what it is like to be buried alive and with his history of self-harm. He then sends a televised message to the entire school in which he proclaims that one should "hear no evil, speak no evil, and see no evil". He cuts off his ear and tongue with a razor blade, then fatally stabs himself in the eye.

Tamara visits the home of Mr. Natolly, intending to seduce him. When he resists her, she says that "it is only a matter of time". The next day, she visits the school counselor and Mr. Natolly's wife, Alison. Tamara confronts Alison, mentioning Alison and Bill's infertility problems. Realizing that her father fantasizes about having sex with her and that his alcoholism drove her mother away, Tamara commands him to eat a beer bottle.

At a party, Tamara places a spell on Patrick and Shawn, forcing them to have sex with each other. Kisha attempts to stop Tamara, but is incapacitated when Tamara mentions Kisha's eating disorder. Tamara tells Kisha that she is "skin and bone, and really should eat more". Kisha begins to eat herself into a stupor, but is taken away by Jesse and Chloe. When Chloe and Jesse call Mr. Natolly to tell him about what happened, Kisha—still under the spell—calls Tamara and tells her that Mr. Natolly knows. Kisha is knocked out by Chloe.

Chloe, Jesse, and Mr. Natolly go to Tamara's house, where they find a spellbook describing the ritual she tried to perform. They realize that when Tamara was killed, her blood was spilled, which completed the ritual and allowed her to rise from the grave and control others through touch. Tamara, learning of what the others know, sends Shawn and Patrick to the Natolly residence to kill Alison, but she manages to kill them both in self-defense. Kisha and Alison are both taken to the hospital and treated, but Kisha wakes up and chases down Jesse and Chloe. Kisha stabs Jesse to death with a carving knife before Chloe knocks her out again with a pizza paddle.

Tamara takes control of the mind of an armed security guard and chases Mr. Natolly, Allison, and Chloe up to the rooftop of the hospital. Tamara attempts to control Chloe, but sees through her memories that Chloe actually cared about her and realizes that she has become a monster. She breaks down and slowly changes back into a corpse. Before fading away, Tamara asserts her will to be with Mr. Natolly and he appears to surrender to the inevitable. Mr. Natolly holds Tamara close and kisses her, then throws himself off the roof with Tamara, killing them both. Kisha, seemingly still under Tamara's spell, takes the spellbook from Chloe's Jeep.

Cast
 Jenna Dewan as Tamara Riley
 Matthew Marsden as Mr. Bill Natolly
 Katie Stuart as Chloe
 Claudette Mink as Mrs. Alison Natolly
 Chad Faust as Jesse
 Bryan Clark as Shawn
 Melissa Elias as Kisha
 Marc Devigne as Roger
 Gil Hacohen as Patrick
 Chris Sigurdson as Mr. Riley, Tamara's father

Reception

Box office
Tamara was released to US cinemas on February 3, 2006. It averaged $2,084 at 14 theatres, for a weekend gross of $29,157. It was in US cinemas for 13 weeks, and finished with a gross of $206,871

Critical reception
Tamara has received a mostly-negative response from critics. Aggregated across 28 reviewers, the film holds a 32% on Rotten Tomatoes, with a consensus stating, "Resolutely misguided without ever really crossing into 'so bad it's good' territory, Tamara lacks even the cheap thrills promised by its premise". This reception is mirrored on Metacritic, where a similar result of 34/100, amortized over 10 critics, materialized, indicating "Generally unfavorable reviews".

Nathan Lee of The New York Times noted its low budget and its "even lower ambitions", but acknowledged that it had "one genuine, if unintentional, surprise". Awarding it one of four stars, Slant grappled with the film's "insufficient imaginativeness" and forced "theme of duality". Maitland McDonagh, a critic specialist in horror films, wrote that Tamara "panders to horror buffs" and "squanders the efforts of a competent cast", calling it a "rehash of Carrie", and awarding it two of five stars. Jessica Reeves of the Chicago Tribune was even more critical, panning the film with a harsh grocery list of descriptions: "dismal, depressing, embarrassing and utterly lacking in any artistic or social worth".

Some reviewers were slightly more magnanimous. For instance, Kyle Smith of the New York Post enjoyed the second act, praising how screenwriter Jeffrey Reddick "develops [the film] suspensefully". He noted some of the "creative murders", which were "grotesque" enough to "make even horror buffs flinch"; however, he decried the clichéd final act, complaining that Tamara is off-screen too much, and asserting that "villainy shouldn't be outsourced", "killings [shouldn't] become routine".

Likewise, Frank Scheck, writing for The Hollywood Reporter, provided a mixed review and confessed that "the film has its dubious pleasures".

References

External links

 
 
 
 
 
 
 

2005 films
2005 horror films
2000s American films
2000s Canadian films
2000s English-language films
2000s high school films
2000s supernatural horror films
2000s teen horror films
American films about revenge
American high school films
American supernatural horror films
American teen horror films
Canadian films about revenge
Canadian high school films
Canadian supernatural horror films
English-language Canadian films
Films about pranks
Films about school bullying
Films about witchcraft
Films scored by Michael Suby
Films set in Illinois
Films shot in Winnipeg
Lionsgate films